The Kleine Zschirnstein ("Little Zschirnstein") is a  table hill in the Elbe Sandstone Mountains in Saxony.

It is located north of the Großer Zschirnstein above the village of Kleingießhübel. The summit plateau rises gently from east to west and is covered in forest. Whilst the southern end of the table descends gradually, there are steep rock faces on the northern side with several free-standing climbing summits. From the top there is an extensive view into Saxon-Bohemian Switzerland.

Rock formations of Saxon Switzerland
Mountains of Saxon Switzerland
Elbe Sandstone Mountains
Reinhardtsdorf-Schöna